25 Serpentis is a star system in the constellation of Serpens Caput. With an apparent magnitude of 5.37, it is just barely visible to the naked eye. The system is estimated to be some 450 light-years (138 parsecs) based on its parallax.

25 Serpentis is a spectroscopic binary, meaning that the individual components are too close to be resolved, but periodic Doppler shifts in their spectra indicate orbital motion. The system consists of a hot B-type giant and an A-type main-sequence star. The two stars orbit each other every 38.9 days, and have a very eccentric orbit, with an orbital eccentricity of 0.731. The primary is a slowly pulsating B-type star, which causes the system to vary by 0.03 magnitudes; for that reason it has been given the variable star designation PT Serpentis.

References

Serpens (constellation)
Slowly pulsating B stars
Serpentis, 25
B-type giants
A-type main-sequence stars
Serpentis, A2
140873
5863
Durchmusterung objects
077227
Serpentis, PT
Spectroscopic binaries